Rough Draft may refer to:

 Rough Draft (novel), a 2005 novel by Sergey Lukyanenko
 Rough Draft: Pop Culture the Way It Almost Was, a 2001 book by Modern Humorist
 Rough Draft Brewing Company, an American microbrewery
 Rough Draft Studios, an American animation studio, and its South Korean sister studio
 Draft document, a preliminary stage of a written work
 "Rough Draft", a song by Yellowcard from One for the Kids